In the motorsport discipline of rallying, Group Rally4 is a formula of rally car specifications determined by the FIA for use in its international competitions: World Rally Championship (WRC) and regional championships. National rallying competitions also allow Group Rally4 cars to compete. There are two technical subclasses of Group Rally4 however these do not affect competitive eligibility. 'Rally4' may be used alone with the same definition. The group was launched in 2019 after the introduction of the Rally Pyramid initiative to reorganise the classes of car and championships in international rallying was approved in June 2018.

The formula for Group Rally4 cars was taken from R2 class of Group R and tweaked with the defining ruleset interchanging the terms, this meant that any existing R2 car homologated or approved since their introduction in 2008 could continue to be used in Rally4 level competition. However, R2 cars homologated prior to 2019 were not required to have a turbo restrictor fitted and remain exempt. Those of R2B class cars also retain the minimum weight of 1030 kg and must use 6.5"x16" on asphalt rallies.

Definition
Group Rally4 cars are defined in FIA document Appendix J - Article 260 as Touring Cars or Large Scale Series Production Cars, supercharged Petrol engine (including rotary engines), 2-wheel drive (front or rear wheel drive)). A production touring car with at least 2500 identical units manufactured must be homologated in Group A, with all the components and changes that make it a Group Rally4 car homologated in an extension. They have a power to weight ratio of 5.1kg/hp.

FIA Competition
Rally4 cars are placed in FIA 'RC4' sporting class alongside R3 and Group A cars.

Cars

See Also
 Rally Pyramid
 Groups Rally
 Group Rally1
 Group Rally2
 Group Rally3
 Group Rally5

References

External links

 

 
Rally groups